Pierre Alleene (19 July 1909 – 1 August 1994) was a French weightlifter. He competed in the men's middleweight event at the 1936 Summer Olympics.

References

1909 births
1994 deaths
French male weightlifters
Olympic weightlifters of France
People associated with physical culture
Weightlifters at the 1936 Summer Olympics
Sportspeople from Roubaix
20th-century French people